KNRS (570 kHz) is an AM radio station licensed to Salt Lake City, Utah. KNRS and sister station 105.9 KNRS-FM simulcast a Talk radio format. The studios are located in West Valley City and the transmitter site is located off West 2300 North Street in Salt Lake City.  570 KNRS operates with 5,000 watts around the clock, covering most of Northern Utah. Other iHeart stations in the Salt Lake City metropolitan area include KAAZ-FM, KZHT, KJMY, and KODJ.

History
The station signed on the air on August 1, 1938 as KUTA on 1500 kHz AM, and was then headed by Utah broadcasting pioneer Frank Carman. In 1956, the station changed its call letters to KLUB. After the station became KLUB in 1956, its programming consisted on music, news, and sports. In the 1950s, KLUB published a local top 40 chart. The station aired a beautiful music format in the 1970s. In the early 1980s, the station aired a MOR music format. In September 1983, the station began airing the "Music of Your Life" nostalgia format. On September 4, 1985, the station's format was changed to adult contemporary. In Autumn 1985, KLUB became the flagship station for the Utah Jazz of the National Basketball Association.

On May 15, 1989, the station's call sign was changed to KISN, and the station began simulcasting the Classic hits format of 97.1 KISN-FM. The simulcast ended in September 1992. On September 1, 1993, the station's format was changed to sports talk and was branded as "Sports Radio 570", making it Utah's second all-sports radio station (after KQOL, now KAAZ-FM). The station became the market's only sports talk station later in the month, when KQOL switched to a country music format. On July 31, 1997, the sports format ended and the station began simulcasting "Timeless" adult standards format of 107.9 KRKR.

On January 9, 1998, after being sold to Jacor Communications, the station's call letters became KNRS, standing for News Radio Station, and the station adopted a news/talk format. The station's branding was "570 K-News". On March 6, 2000, KNRS became known as "Family Values Talk Radio", and the station adopted an almost entirely syndicated talk radio format, carrying programming such as The Rush Limbaugh Show and Dr. Laura. KNRS' call sign was changed to KACP on September 1, 2009.

In January 2009, as KNRS, the station began simulcasting its programming on FM HD Radio at 94.1 HD-2. KACP also broadcast on an FM translator in Utah County on 99.1 FM, and KJMY HD-2 up until March 2010. 99.1 switched formats to classic Country music, being fed by the HD-2 channel of KJMY 99.5. Though 99.1 is a translator, through a loophole in FCC regulations, the station can broadcast an HD-2 feed. KACP was then no longer available on the FM dial, until switching back to KNRS.

On August 3, 2009, Clear Channel moved the Talk programming airing on 570 over to 105.7 on the FM dial. For about six weeks, both 570 and 105.7 were simulcast.

On September 17, 2009, KACP split off in a more business-oriented direction as "Freedom 570", with a lineup including Cox Radio hosts Neal Boortz and Clark Howard as well as Clear Channel in-house shows Jason Lewis, The Schnitt Show and Handel on the Law.

On January 3, 2010, the station changed its calls back to KNRS and began simulcasting its sister FM signal.  The station obtained a construction permit from the U.S. Federal Communications Commission (FCC) for a power increase to 50,000 watts day and 5,000 watts night. However the construction permit expired before the upgrade was built.

References

External links

FCC History Cards for KNRS

NRS
Radio stations established in 1938
IHeartMedia radio stations
1938 establishments in Utah